Irun Colon is a railway station in Irun, Basque Country, Spain. It is owned by Euskal Trenbide Sarea and operated by Euskotren. It lies on the San Sebastián-Hendaye railway, popularly known as the Topo line.

History 
The station opened in 1912 as the eastern terminus of the San Sebastián-Hendaye railway. The line was extended to  the next year.

The station was made fully accessible in 2018, when an elevator was added to the Hendaye-bound platform. Previously, the only step-free access to that platform was via the opposite platform and a level crossing, which was removed afterwards.

Services 
The station is served by Euskotren Trena line E2. In the  direction, it runs every 15 minutes during weekdays and weekend afternoons, and every 30 minutes on weekend mornings. In the  direction, it runs every 30 minutes throughout the week.

References

External links
 

Euskotren Trena stations
Railway stations in Gipuzkoa
Railway stations in Spain opened in 1912
Irun